Thomas Lewis Rubey (September 27, 1862 – November 2, 1928) was a U.S. Representative from Missouri, serving eight terms (two non-consecutive) from 1911 to 1921 and again from 1923 until his death in 1928.

Early career 
Born in Lebanon, Missouri, Rubey attended the common schools. He graduated from the University of Missouri in Columbia, Missouri in 1885 and served as Superintendent of schools of Lebanon from 1886 to 1891.

Rubey served as member of the state House of Representatives in 1891 and 1892, and was a teacher at the Missouri School of Mines from 1891 to 1898, before he moved to La Plata, Missouri in 1898 and organized a bank.

Rubey served in the State Senate from 1901 to 1903 and was elected president of the senate in 1903.

Upon the resignation of Lt. Gov. John A. Lee in that year Rubey became the 25th Lieutenant Governor serving under Alexander Monroe Dockery, serving in that capacity until 1905. He returned to Lebanon in 1905 and engaged in banking, serving as president of the State Bank there from 1914 until his death.

Congress
Rubey was elected as a Democrat to the Sixty-second and to the four succeeding Congresses (March 4, 1911 – March 3, 1921). He was an unsuccessful candidate for reelection in 1920 to the Sixty-seventh Congress.

Rubey was elected to the Sixty-eighth, Sixty-ninth, and Seventieth Congresses and served from March 4, 1923, until his death in Lebanon in 1928.

He was interred in Lebanon Cemetery.

See also
List of United States Congress members who died in office (1900–49)

References

1862 births
1928 deaths
People from Lebanon, Missouri
Lieutenant Governors of Missouri
University of Missouri alumni
Democratic Party Missouri state senators
Democratic Party members of the United States House of Representatives from Missouri
People from Macon County, Missouri